is a Shinto shrine located in Yoshino district, Nara Prefecture, Japan. The honden, or main hall, is constructed in the nagare-zukuri style.

In 2004, it was designated as part of a UNESCO World Heritage Site under the name Sacred Sites and Pilgrimage Routes in the Kii Mountain Range.

External links

Shinto shrines in Nara Prefecture